The Longitude Act 1714 was an Act of Parliament of Great Britain passed in July 1714 at the end of the reign of Queen Anne. It established the Board of Longitude and offered monetary rewards (Longitude rewards) for anyone who could find a simple and practical method for the precise determination of a ship's longitude. The Act of 1714 was followed by a series of other Longitude Acts that revised or replaced the original.

Background

As transoceanic travel grew in significance, so did the importance of accurate and reliable navigation at sea. Scientists and navigators had been working on the problem of measuring longitude for a long time. While determining latitude was relatively easy, early ocean navigators had to rely on dead reckoning to find longitude. This was particularly inaccurate on long voyages without sight of land and could sometimes lead to tragedy, as during the Scilly naval disaster of 1707 which claimed the lives of nearly 2,000 sailors. This brought the problem of measuring longitude at sea into sharp focus once more. Following the Merchants and Seamen Petition, which called for finding an adequate solution and was presented to Parliament in May 1714, the Longitude Act was passed in July 1714.

For details on many of the efforts towards determining the longitude, see History of longitude.

The rewards

The Longitude Act offered a series of rewards, rather than a single prize. The reward was to be increased to £15,000 if the error was not greater than 40 minutes, and further enhanced to £20,000 if it was not greater than half a degree. Other rewards were on offer for those who presented methods that worked within 80 geographical miles of the coast (being the most treacherous part of voyages) and for those with promising ideas who needed help to bring them to readiness for trial. Many rewards were paid out over the 114 years of the Board of Longitude's existence. John Harrison received more money than any other individual, with several rewards from the 1730s–1750s, and £10,000 in 1765.

Subsequent Longitude Acts offered different rewards. The Longitude Act 1818, which completely revised the composition and remit of the Board of Longitude, again changed the rewards, by now offered for improvements to navigation in general rather than simply for finding longitude. In addition, the Act outlined rewards for navigating the North West Passage, again on a sliding scale from £20,000 for reaching the Pacific through a north-west passage to £5,000 for reaching 110 degrees west or 89 degrees north and £1,000 for reaching 83 degrees north.

References

Further reading
 Alexi Baker (July 2013), Longitude Acts, Board of Longitude project, University of Cambridge Digital Library
 Image of the original act from the Parliamentary Archives

Great Britain Acts of Parliament 1714
History of navigation
Challenge awards
1714 establishments in Great Britain